Fort Thomas is a census-designated place in Graham County, Arizona, United States. Its population was 319 as of the 2020 census. The community has an elementary school and a high school. It is part of the Safford Micropolitan Statistical Area. Fort Thomas has a ZIP code of 85536.

Geography

Climate
Fort Thomas has a borderline semi-arid climate (Köppen BSh/BSk) bordering upon an arid climate (BWh/BWk) characterised by very hot summers and winters with mild days and cold nights. Daily temperatures are comfortable during winter – only 5.6 days do not top  – but heat up rapidly as summer approaches, with half of all days by May topping  and 35.5 days topping  during an average entire year.

Rainfall is rare, with monsoonal storms much less frequent than higher up or further south.

Demographics

History 

The earliest military presence in the area was former Camp Goodwin, constructed in 1864 and named for Arizona's first territorial governor, John N. Goodwin. The camp was abandoned after a short time due to failed buildings and malaria from a nearby spring. In 1876, the current site of the community was chosen as a "new post on the Gila," selected to replace Camp Goodwin during the Apache Wars. Initially, the site was named Camp Thomas in honor of Civil War Major General George Henry Thomas. Until 1882 the area would be known by several names including Clantonville, Camp Thomas, Maxey and finally Fort Thomas.

At its peak, the fort consisted of 27 buildings, all constructed by the occupants of the fort and made of adobe. Malaria remained a problem throughout the occupation of the area, and led to Fort Thomas being called the "worst fort in the Army." The fort also had no government funding until the year 1884. After the capture of Geronimo in 1886, the Army gradually removed the troops stationed there until the fort was handed over to the Department of the Interior in 1891.

The early town had a poor reputation, and was home to several houses of prostitution and saloons. Camp Thomas was to be the destination of the pay wagons involved in the Wham Paymaster robbery of 1889. In 1895, the community grew significantly when the Southern Pacific railroad's construction in the area was halted due to native Apache people refusing to let the railroad continue construction through their reservation. During this time, Fort Thomas also hosted a Wells Fargo station.

Education

Fort Thomas has its own unified school district, the Fort Thomas Unified School District that serves the community of Fort Thomas, as well as students from nearby Bylas. The school district operates the Fort Thomas Elementary School and the Fort Thomas High School.

Notable person
 Melvin Jones – Founder of Lions Clubs International

References

Safford, Arizona micropolitan area
Populated places established in 1876
Thomas
Unincorporated communities in Arizona
Census-designated places in Graham County, Arizona
1876 establishments in Arizona Territory